"Tant besoin de toi" is a song by French singer Marc Antoine, released on March 14, 2008, as him debut, Comme il se doit album.

Charts

References

2008 songs
2008 singles